The Roman Catholic Diocese of Noto is a diocese of the Roman Catholic Church in Sicily, Italy. It is a suffragan diocese of the  Archdiocese of Siracusa. Monsignor Antonio Staglianò is the current bishop of the diocese of Noto.

History
The diocese was canonically erected on May 15, 1844, by Pope Gregory XVI, separating it from the Archdiocese of Syracuse, of which Noto is suffragan.

Geography
The diocese is located in the Province of Syracuse, Sicily,  Italy. The seat of the bishop is in Noto Cathedral.

Bishops

Bishops of Noto
 Giuseppe Menditto (1844-1849), resigned
 Giovanni Battista Naselli C.O. (1851-1864), appointed Archbishop of Palermo
 Mario Giuseppe Mirone (1853-1864)
 Benedetto Lavecchia O.F.M. (1872-1975), appointed Archbishop of Siracusa
 Giovanni Blandini (1875-1913)
 Giuseppe Vizzini (1913-1935)
 Angelo Calabretta (1936-1970), appointed Bishop of Vergi
 Salvatore Nicolosi (1970-1998), retired
 Giuseppe Malandrino (1998-2007), retired
 Mariano Crociata (2007-2008), appointed Secretary-General of the Italian Episcopal Conference
 Antonio Staglianò (2009-2022)
 Salvatore Rumeo (2022-present)

Churches

Cattedrale di San Nicolò di Mira (Seat of the Bishop of Noto).
Church of Santa Caterina.
Church of San Corrado.
Church of the Collegio di San Carlo.
Church of the Sacro Nome di Gesu.
Monastery of Santa Chiara (1735), designed by Gagliardi. It has an oval plant, the interior divided by twelve columns housing a Madonna with Child from the 16th century.
Church of San Michele Arcangelo.
Church of Santa Maria della Scala.
Church of Santissimo Salvatore.
Church of San Nicola di Mira.
Church of Santa Chiara, with a precious Madonna (by Antonello Gagini).
Church of San Francesco d'Assisi (Immacolata).
Church of the Spirito Santo.
Church of Ecce Homo.
Church of Santa Maria dell'Arco.
Church of the Anime Sante del Purgatorio ("Holy Souls of the Purgatory").
Church of Santa Maria della Rotonda.
Church of the  Santissima Trinità.
Church of San Carlo al Corso (by Rosario Gagliardi).
Church of Santa Maria del Carmelo.
Church of San Pietro Martire.
Church of San Michele Arcangelo.
Church of San Domenico (by Rosario Gagliardi).
Church of Sant'Antonio Abate.
Church of  Santa Caterina.
Church of the Crociferio di San Camillo.
Church of Montevergine (San Girolamo).
Church of Santissimo Salvatore.
Church of San Andrea Apostolo.
Church of San Pietro delle Rose (Saints Peter and Paul).
Church of the SS. Crocifisso.
Church of Sant'Egidio Vescovo.
Church of Santa Maria del Gesù.
Church of Annunziata.
Church of Santa Agata.

Footnotes

See also
The Catholic Encyclopedia, Volume XI. Published 1913. New York: Robert Appleton Company

External links
 Website of the Diocese
GCatholic.org
Catholic Hierarchy

Catholic Church in Italy
Roman Catholic dioceses in Sicily
Diocese
Religious organizations established in 1844
Roman Catholic dioceses and prelatures established in the 19th century
1844 establishments in Italy